Carlo Caccia Dominioni (1802–1866) was an Italian prelate, who become auxiliary bishop of Milan.

Life 
Born in Milan in the noble family of Caccia Dominioni he entered in 1812 in the seminary of Milan, then in 1826 he was ordained a priest. In 1853 he was named member of the archdiocesan Chapter and two years later he was named auxiliary bishop of Milan and titular bishop of Famagosta. In 1859 archbishop Romilli died and the chapter of the cathedral named Caccia Dominioni as diocesan administrator during the vacancy of the see. For the succession to archbishop Romilli, Caccia Dominioni was one of the candidates but pope Pius IX chose with the advice of Austrian Emperator the more conservative Paolo Angelo Ballerini the vicar of archbishop Romilli.

Soon after the death of archbishop Romilli the Austrian Empire was defeated in the Second Italian War of Independence and the new Italian government refused to recognize Ballerini as archbishop of Milan, so Caccia Dominioni was forced to assume the duty of archbishop of Milan. The events of the years 1859 and 1860 stiffened Caccia Dominioni who refused to celebrate a Te Deum for the birth of Italy, in reaction for this decision many clergy of the archdiocese together with many lay people forced Caccia Dominioni to escape in his family residence in Cornate d'Adda and later in Monza. He was later deported to Turin and sentenced by the Italian authorities to spend time in jail that he never served, and he wasn't allowed to come back to Milan.

He died in Cornate d'Adda in 1866.

References 

1802 births
1866 deaths
19th-century Italian Roman Catholic bishops
Bishops of Milan